The 2022 SWAC Championship Game was a college football game played on December 3, 2022, at Mississippi Veterans Memorial Stadium in Jackson, Mississippi. It was the 24th edition of the SWAC Championship Game and determined the champion of the Southwestern Athletic Conference (SWAC) for the 2022 season. The game began at 3:00 p.m. CST on ESPN2. The game featured the Jackson State Tigers, the East Division champions, and the Southern Jaguars, the West Division champions. Sponsored by wireless service provider Cricket and by beverage corporation PepsiCo, the game was officially known as the 2022 Cricket SWAC Football Championship presented by Pepsi. The winner of the game received a bid to the Celebration Bowl to face the champions of the Mid-Eastern Athletic Conference (MEAC), the North Carolina Central Eagles.

Teams

Jackson State

Jackson State clinched a spot in the game following its defeat of Alabama A&M on November 12. The win also ensured they would host the game.

Southern

Southern clinched a spot by defeating Grambing State in the Bayou Classic on November 26.

References

Championship Game
2022 12
Jackson State Tigers football games
Southern Jaguars football games
College sports in Mississippi
Sports competitions in Mississippi
Sports in Jackson, Mississippi
SWAC Championship Game
SWAC Championship Game